Mayor Porter may refer to:

John Clinton Porter, 33rd mayor of Los Angeles from 1929 to 1933.
Robert Porter (mayor)
James E. Porter (1857–1946), mayor of Kansas City, Kansas from 1910 to 1913.
Nelson Davis Porter (1863-1961), mayor of Ottawa, Canada from 1915 to 1916
DeForest Porter (1840–1889) mayor of Phoenix, Arizona Territory